Kermia euryacme is a species of sea snail, a marine gastropod mollusc in the family Raphitomidae.

Description
The length of the shell varies between 4 mm and 5 mm.

Distribution
This marine species occurs off Taiwan.

References

 Mellvill, J. Cosmo. "Descriptions of eight new species of the family Turridae and of a new species of Mitra." Journal of Molluscan Studies 17.4 (1927): 149–155.

External links
 Gastropods.com: Kermia euryacme

euryacme
Gastropods described in 1927